The 2020–21 UAB Blazers women's basketball team represents the University of Alabama at Birmingham during the 2020–21 NCAA Division I women's basketball season. The team is led by eighth-year head coach Randy Norton, and plays their home games at the Bartow Arena in Birmingham, Alabama as a member of Conference USA.

Schedule and results

|-
!colspan=12 style=|Regular season

|-
!colspan=12 style=| CUSA Tournament

See also
 2020–21 UAB Blazers men's basketball team

Notes

References

UAB Blazers women's basketball seasons
UAB Blazers
UAB Blazers women's basketball
UAB Blazers women's basketball